Byala may refer to:
 Byala, Varna Province, a town in Varna Province in northeastern Bulgaria
 Byala, Ruse Province, a town in Ruse Province in northern Bulgaria
 , a village in Sliven Municipality in southeastern Bulgaria
Nawarupa - a mythical creature in Burmese and Arakanese mythology

See also 
 Biala (disambiguation)